These are the team rosters of the 16 teams competing in the 2011 FIBA Asia Championship.

Group A

Head coach:  Kenny Natt

Head coach: Hur Jae

Head coach: Ghassan Sarkis

Head coach: Goh Cheng Huat

Group B

Head coach: Chou Jun-san

Head coach:  Veselin Matić

Head coach: Ali Fakhroo

Head coach: Oleg Levin

Group C

Head coach: Rastafari Horongbala

Head coach:  Tom Wisman

Head coach:  Tab Baldwin

Head coach:  Goran Miljević

Group D

Head coach:  Erik Rashad

Head coach:  Bob Donewald

Head coach:  Rajko Toroman

Head coach:  Zoran Zupčević

References 
Official website
FIBA.com

FIBA Asia Cup squads
Squads